Eva-Karin Westin (born 24 June 1972) is a Swedish biathlete. She competed at both the 1994 Winter Olympics and the 1998 Winter Olympics.

References

External links
 

1972 births
Living people
Biathletes at the 1994 Winter Olympics
Biathletes at the 1998 Winter Olympics
Swedish female biathletes
Olympic biathletes of Sweden
Place of birth missing (living people)